Hjärnkontoret ("Think Tank") is a Swedish children's science programme broadcast by SVT since 10 January 1995 (then hosted by Fredrik Berling). Today, it's hosted by Benjamin "Beppe" Singer and its earlier hosts include DJ Webster, Frida Nilsson, Henry Chu, Victoria Dyring and Fredrik Berling.

Awards
2002 – Kunskapspriset
2006 – Kristallen
2011 – Årets folkbildare

References/sources

External links
Hjärnkontoret's website (http://svt.se/hjarnkontoret)
Hjärnkontoret on Swedish Media Database

Swedish children's television series
Sveriges Television original programming
1990s Swedish television series
2000s Swedish television series
2010s Swedish television series
1995 Swedish television series debuts